Matthijs Nicolaas van de Sande Bakhuyzen (born 16 October 1988) is a Dutch movie and television actor and former child actor.

Biography
Van de Sande Bakhuyzen was born on 16 October 1988 in Amsterdam, the son of movie director Willem van de Sande Bakhuyzen. In 1992 his sister Roeltje van de Sande Bakhuyzen, who is also an actress, was born.

His big break was in 1999, with the role of Erik in the VPRO television series De Daltons. He later played small roles in several films directed by his father, including Cloaca (2003) and Leef! (2005). That same year, his father died of cancer.

In 2006, he had his first big role in a movie when he beat 4000 other applicants for the role of Jordi in the movie Afblijven, a teen-oriented film based on a novel by Carry Slee.

Van de Sande Bakhuyzen received acting lessons from Carla van Driel and Tom de Ket in 2006. At the end of 2006, he was filming De Daltons, de jongensjaren, the sequel of De Daltons which was aired in the 2007-2008 television season.

In 2008, Van de Sande Bakhuyzen was in the telefilm Bloedbroeders. In 2009 he acted in Het Leven uit een dag (2009).  In 2011 he graduated from the Theatre Academy Maastricht.  He has appeared in the musical Help! at Seattle Children's Theatre.

Filmography

References

External links
 

1988 births
Living people
Dutch male film actors
Male actors from Amsterdam